The Takitimu gecko (Mokopirirakau cryptozoicus) is a species of gecko in the family Diplodactylidae found in the Southland region of New Zealand. It is endemic to New Zealand.

Conservation status 
As of 2012 the Department of Conservation (DOC) classified the Takitimu gecko as Nationally Vulnerable under the New Zealand Threat Classification System.

See also
Geckos of New Zealand

References

External links
Image of holotype specimen for Mokopirirakau cryptozoicus

Mokopirirakau
Reptiles of New Zealand
Reptiles described in 2004
Taxa named by Tony Jewell (herpetologist)
Taxa named by Richard Leschen